Equality Illinois (EI) was founded in 1991 to work towards building a better Illinois by advancing equal treatment and social justice through education, advocacy, and protection of the rights of the LGBT community.

Structure
The Equality Illinois Institute focuses on the educational and charitable aspects of the mission. EI's initiatives extend throughout every sector of Illinois life, reaching individuals and organizations both in the LGBTQ community and society at large, across the private, public and non-profit sectors.

The Equality Illinois Political Action Committee (PAC) promotes candidates for public office who will advocate for and  support legislation that advances full equality for LGBTQ individuals and families.

The organization is a member of the Equality Federation.

EQIL's Work
 Equality Illinois works with legislators in Washington, D.C. and in Springfield, as well as leaders at the local level to ensure that the LGBTQ community has a voice at the table when major decisions are made. Equality Illinois is a 501(c)(4) organization and has educational and political action affiliate organizations.
 The Equality Illinois Institute, a 501(c)(3) educational organization affiliated with Equality Illinois, focuses on the educational and charitable aspects of EI's mission. Through the Equality Illinois Institute, Equality Illinois continues to educate the public about the need to secure the rights of all Illinois citizens, couples, and families. EI's work reaches individuals and organizations both in the LGBTQ community and the general public across the private, public, and nonprofit sectors.
 Equality Illinois PAC, a non-partisan state political action committee affiliated with Equality Illinois, fights aggressively every election cycle to recruit, support, and elect candidates who will stand up for our rights in Springfield and beyond. Equality Illinois PAC supports candidates for state, county, and local office who believe that every citizen has a basic right to equal treatment under the law regardless of sexual orientation or gender identity.

Equality Illinois Publications and Reports
 Marriage Rights in Illinois
 Equality Illinois DOMA FAQs
 Civil Union Report: Separate Not Proven to be Equal
 Name and Gender Marker Changes Tool Kit
 Raising the Bar 2016
 The Law Firm Best Practices Manual
 Equality Illinois 2015 Marriage Planning Guide
 The Rauner Administration at Six Months
 Season of Inclusion 2015 Brochure
 Corporate Best Practices: A Guide to LGBTQ-Inclusive Workplaces in Illinois
 Growing Your Family: A Guide for Prospective LGBTQ Parents
 Tax Implications of Marriage Equality
 LGBTQ Supportive Religious Officiant List 2014

Equality Illinois "Know Your Rights" Pamphlets
 Safe Schools
 Transgender Issues
 Employment
 Immigration
 Marriage Recognition at the Federal Level
 Health Services
 Housing

History and Past Achievements
Equality Illinois was formerly called the Illinois Federation for Human Rights, and Lana Hostetler cofounded it. 

Equality Illinois is now the Midwest's largest and most influential LGBTQ civil rights organizations. Among its accomplishments are:

Religious Freedom and Marriage Fairness Act

 Promoted, lobbied for and won passage of the Religious Freedom and Marriage Fairness Act in 2013, which gave same-sex couples in Illinois the right to marry.

Illinois Religious Freedom Protection and Civil Union Act

 Promoted, lobbied for and won passage of the Illinois Religious Freedom Protection and Civil Union Act (civil union law) in 2010, which promises the same benefits, obligations and responsibilities of marriage (under state law). The major benefits include hospital visitation, healthcare decision making, inheritance and probate rights;

Youth Mental Health Protection Act
 Promoted, lobbied for and won passage of the Youth Mental Health Protection Act (conversion therapy ban) in 2015, banning the harmful practice of conversion therapy to be used on minors in the state of Illinois. The practice of gay conversion therapy was harshly criticized by Illinois mental health experts in March 2015 when a group of experts released a letter saying efforts to force LGBTQ youth to change are harmful and ineffective and urged state action to stop it.

Safe Schools Act

 Worked in coalition with partner groups to advance and pass the Safe Schools Act, which was signed into law in June 2010;

Human Rights Act

 Promoted, lobbied for and won passage of amendments to the Human Rights Act in 2005, prohibiting discrimination based upon sexual orientation and gender identity;

Vote Naked Illinois

 Developed a ground breaking "Get Out the Vote" campaign, Vote Naked Illinois, which received extensive media coverage statewide and around the globe. The campaign led to over 75,000 mail-in votes in the 2010 election in Cook County/City of Chicago alone.
 Registered thousands of new Illinois voters, and developed a strong network of over 17,000 human rights supporters throughout Illinois and beyond;
 Educated and informed citizens of Illinois and members of the General Assembly, and worked to raise awareness of issues confronting LGBTQ individuals in the community and workplace;

Fair Illinois

 Equality Illinois also joined with three other organizations to launch the Fair Illinois initiative dedicated to opposing an anti-gay marriage advisory referendum proposed for the November 2006 ballot. This massive undertaking involve the review of more than 345,000 individual petition signatures, a challenge met entirely by volunteers. After months of challenges, fairness finally won out in September 2006.

Other Accomplishments

 Expanded statewide grassroots support for LGBTQ issues and initiatives, individually, as well as in partnership with religious institutions and other community organizations;
 Targeted information and services to populations that have been disenfranchised, such as women, minorities and youth;
 Assisted businesses in development of welcoming and inclusive workplace policies;
 Conducted polls and surveys of public attitudes on civil rights issues;
 Worked to educate the media and encourage public discussion about these issues.

Illinois Unites for Marriage Coalition
In 2012-2013, Equality Illinois played a significant role advocating for same-sex marriage in Illinois. The organization partnered with Lambda Legal and ACLU of Illinois to create the Illinois Unites for Marriage coalition to push for the bill. The same-sex marriage bill passed the legislature in 2013 and was signed into law by Gov. Pat Quinn on Nov. 20, 2013.

Annual Gala
The Equality Illinois Gala, annually the largest LGBTQ event of its kind in the Midwest, is held every winter to celebrate the previous year's achievements for the Illinois LGBTQ community. This year’s event will celebrate Equality Illinois’ 25th Anniversary Jubilee Year and is expected to draw more than 1,400 guests, including nearly 100 public officials and many community VIPs.

Freedom Award
The Equality Illinois Freedom Award is given annually at the Equality Illinois gala to celebrate exemplary allies of the Illinois LGBTQ community. House Democratic Leader Nancy Pelosi will accept the recognition at the Equality Illinois 25th Anniversary Gala on February 6, 2016. Past Freedom Award winners include Illinois Senate President John Cullerton, state Rep. Greg Harris, the late state Comptroller Dawn Clark Netsch, the late state Rep. Mark Beaubien Jr., state Sen. Heather Steans, U.S. Sen. Mark Kirk, the Chicago Urban League, entertainer Lea DeLaria, the TransLife Center of Chicago House and filmmaker Lana Wachowski.

Honors
In 2005 Equality Illinois was inducted into the Chicago Gay and Lesbian Hall of Fame.

2016 Logo
Equality Illinois' new logo was unveiled on January 14, 2016. The modern, bright logo represents refreshed vigor for the work of the next quarter century. The new slogan–UNTIL WE'RE ALL EQUAL–summarizes the LGBTQ organization's mission to "build a better Illinois by advancing equal treatment and social justice through education, advocacy and protection of the rights of the LGBTQ community." In the wake of high-profile successes, the organization retooled their organization to build an Equality Illinois that is ready for the next phase of the movement.

See also

 LGBT rights in Illinois
 LGBT history in Illinois
 Same-sex marriage in Illinois
 List of LGBT rights organizations

References

External links

LGBT political advocacy groups in Illinois
1991 establishments in Illinois
Organizations established in 1991
Non-profit organizations based in Chicago
Equality Federation